Timea Bacsinszky was the defending champion, but chose not to participate.

Cristina Bucșa won the title, defeating Tamara Korpatsch in the final, 6–2, 6–7(11–13), 7–6(8–6).

Seeds

Draw

Finals

Top half

Bottom half

References

Main Draw

Engie Open Nantes Atlantique - Singles
Open Nantes Atlantique